Irina Anatolyevna Aksyonova (also Aksenova, ;  born 24 September 1962) is a retired Russian swimmer. She won bronze medals in the 4 × 100 m medley relay at the 1978 World Aquatics Championships and 1980 Summer Olympics, where she swam for the Soviet Union team in the preliminaries. At the 1980 Olympics she also finished fourth in the 800 m, fifth in the 400 m and eighth in the 200 m freestyle events.

Between 1977 and 1980 she won seven national titles and set five national records in 200–800 m freestyle events. However, when her medley relay team finished third at the 1978 World Championships, she was swimming the 100 m butterfly leg. Currently she lives in Czech Republic.

References

1962 births
Living people
Russian female freestyle swimmers
Swimmers at the 1980 Summer Olympics
Olympic swimmers of the Soviet Union
Olympic bronze medalists for the Soviet Union
Olympic bronze medalists in swimming
Medalists at the 1980 Summer Olympics
World Aquatics Championships medalists in swimming
Soviet female freestyle swimmers